Martin Marinčin (born 18 February 1992) is a Slovak professional ice hockey defenceman for HC Oceláři Třinec of the Czech Extraliga (ELH). He was drafted in the second round, 46th overall, by the Edmonton Oilers in the 2010 NHL Entry Draft.

Playing career
Having been drafted by the Edmonton Oilers in the second round, 46th overall, at the 2010 NHL Entry Draft, on 25 April 2011, the Oilers signed Marinčin to a three-year, entry-level contract. During the 2013–14 season, Marinčin was called up to the Oilers, and on 5 December 2013, he made his NHL debut in a game against the Colorado Avalanche.

On 27 June 2015, Marinčin was traded to the Toronto Maple Leafs in exchange for Brad Ross and a fourth-round pick in the 2015 NHL Entry Draft.

On 5 October 2017, Marinčin was placed on waivers by the Maple Leafs. After clearing waivers the next day, he was loaned to the Maple Leafs' American Hockey League (AHL) affiliate, the Toronto Marlies. On 17 December 2017, he was recalled to the Toronto Maple Leafs after Nikita Zaitsev was placed on the injured reserve with a lower-body injury. Marinčin appeared in two games with the Leafs before being sent down to the Marlies on 5 January 2018.

On 29 June 2019, Marinčin agreed to a one-year $700,000 contract extension to remain with the Maple Leafs. On 10 January 2020, Marinčin agreed to another one-year $700,000 contract extension to remain with the Maple Leafs.

After six seasons within the Maple Leafs organization, Marinčin left as an impending free agent, returning to Europe in signing a one-year contract with the Czech club, HC Oceláři Třinec of the ELH, on 16 June 2021.

International play 

Marinčin was chosen to play for Slovakia at the 2011 World Junior Championships. During a game against the United States, he was ejected for a hit to the head on forward Jason Zucker. This ejection carried an automatic one-game suspension, and after a review of the play, Marinčin was suspended for an additional three games.

Marinčin was named to the Slovak senior team to compete at the 2014 Winter Olympics in Sochi.

Career statistics

Regular season and playoffs

International

Awards and honors

References

External links 

 

1992 births
Living people
Edmonton Oilers draft picks
Edmonton Oilers players
HC Košice players
Ice hockey players at the 2014 Winter Olympics
Ice hockey players at the 2022 Winter Olympics
Oklahoma City Barons players
Olympic ice hockey players of Slovakia
Medalists at the 2022 Winter Olympics
Olympic bronze medalists for Slovakia
Olympic medalists in ice hockey
Prince George Cougars players
Regina Pats players
Slovak ice hockey defencemen
Slovak expatriate ice hockey players in Canada
Slovak expatriate ice hockey players in the United States
Sportspeople from Košice
Toronto Maple Leafs players
Toronto Marlies players